Mount Adrian is a mountain on Vancouver Island, British Columbia, Canada, located  southwest of Campbell River and  northwest of Alexandra Peak.

References

Adrian, Mount
One-thousanders of British Columbia
Comox Land District